Mira Banjac (born 4 November 1929) is a Serbian actress.

She won a number of awards, including an award for her work in Mamaroš from Brasil and  Golden Medal for Merits of Republic of Serbia.

Selected filmography
 Beach Guard in Winter (1976)
 Do You Remember Dolly Bell? (1981)
 The Elusive Summer of '68 (1984)
 72 Days (2010)
 When Day Breaks (2012)
 Mamaroš (2013)
 The High Sun (2015)
 Requiem for Mrs. J. (2017)

References

External links
 

1929 births
Living people
People from Erdevik
Serbian film actresses
Golden Arena winners
Laureates of the Ring of Dobrica
Žanka Stokić award winners